Harold Mortimer Hungerford (18 December 1908 – 10 January 1972 ) was a Member of the Queensland Legislative Assembly. He represented the seat of Balonne from 1969 to 1972.
 
Hungerford in office in 1972.

References

Members of the Queensland Legislative Assembly
1908 births
1972 deaths
20th-century Australian politicians